Valerie L. Thomas (born February 8, 1943) is an American data scientist and inventor. She invented the illusion transmitter, for which she received a patent in 1980. She was responsible for developing the digital media formats image processing systems used in the early years of NASA's Landsat program.

Early life and education 
Thomas was born in Baltimore, Maryland. She graduated from high school in 1961, during the era of integration. She attended Morgan State University, where she was one of two women majoring in physics. Thomas excelled in her mathematics and science courses at Morgan State University, graduating with a degree in physics with highest honors in 1964.

Career
Thomas began working for NASA as a data analyst in 1964. She developed real-time computer data systems to support satellite operations control centers (1964–1970). She oversaw the creation of the Landsat program (1970–1981), becoming an international expert in Landsat data products. Her participation in this program expanded upon the works of other NASA scientists in the pursuit of being able to visualize Earth from space. 

In 1974, Thomas headed a team of approximately 50 people for the Large Area Crop Inventory Experiment (LACIE), a joint effort with the NASA Johnson Space Center, the National Oceanic and Atmospheric Administration (NOAA), and the U.S. Department of Agriculture. An unprecedented scientific project, LACIE demonstrated the feasibility of using space technology to automate the process of predicting wheat yield on a worldwide basis.

She attended an exhibition in 1976 that included an illusion of a light bulb that appeared to be lit, even though it had been removed from its socket. The illusion, which involved another light bulb and concave mirrors, inspired Thomas. Curious about how light and concave mirrors could be used in her work at NASA, she began her research in 1977. This involved creating an experiment in which she observed how the position of a concave mirror would affect the real object that is reflected. Using this technology, she would invent an optical device called the illusion transmitter. On October 21, 1980, she obtained the patent for the illusion transmitter, a device NASA continues to use today, and it's being adapted for use in surgery, as well as for televisions and video screens.
.  Thomas became associate chief of the Space Science Data Operations Office at NASA. Thomas's invention has been depicted in a children's fictional book, television, and in video games. 

In 1985, as the NSSDC Computer Facility manager, Thomas was responsible for a major consolidation and reconfiguration of two previously independent computer facilities, and infused them with new technology. She then served as the Space Physics Analysis Network (SPAN) project manager from 1986 to 1990 during a period when SPAN underwent a major reconfiguration and grew from a scientific network with approximately 100 computer nodes to one directly connecting approximately 2,700 computer nodes worldwide. Thomas' team was credited with developing a computer network that connected research stations of scientists from around the world to improve scientific collaboration. 

In 1990, SPAN became a major part of NASA's science networking and today's Internet. She also participated in projects related to Halley's Comet, ozone research, satellite technology, and the Voyager spacecraft.

She mentored countless numbers of students in the Mathematics Aerospace Research and Technology Inc. program. Because of her unique career and commitment to giving something back to the community, Thomas often spoke to groups of students from elementary school, secondary, college, and university ages, as well as adult groups. As a role model for potential young black engineers and scientists, she made hundreds of visits to schools and national meetings over the years. She has mentored many students working in summer programs at Goddard Space Flight Center. She also judged at science fairs, working with organizations such as the National Technical Association (NTA) and Women in Science and Engineering (WISE). These latter programs encourage students from various underrepresented groups to pursue science and technology careers.

At the end of August 1995, she retired from NASA and her positions of associate chief of the NASA Space Science Data Operations Office, manager of the NASA Automated Systems Incident Response Capability, and as chair of the Space Science Data Operations Office Education Committee.

Retirement 
After retiring, Thomas served as an associate at the UMBC Center for Multicore Hybrid Productivity Research. She also continued to mentor youth through the Science Mathematics Aerospace Research and Technology, Inc. and the National Technical Association.

Notable achievements 
Throughout her career, Thomas held high-level positions at NASA including heading the Large Area Crop Inventory Experiment (LACIE) collaboration between NASA, NOAA, and USDA in 1974, serving as assistant program manager for Landsat/Nimbus (1975–1976), managing the NSSDC Computer Facility (1985), managing the Space Physics Analysis Network project (1986–1990), and serving as associate chief of the Space Science Data Operations Office. She authored many scientific papers and holds a patent for the illusion transmitter. For her achievements, Thomas has received numerous awards including the Goddard Space Flight Center Award of Merit and the NASA Equal Opportunity Medal.

See also 
 Timeline of women in science
 Mary Jackson (engineer)
 Dorothy Vaughan
 Katherine Johnson
 Claudia Alexander
 Doris Cohen
 Lynnae Quick

References

1943 births
Living people
20th-century American inventors
21st-century American physicists
21st-century American women scientists
African-American inventors
American women physicists
Morgan State University alumni
NASA people
University of Maryland, Baltimore County faculty
Women inventors
21st-century African-American women
21st-century African-American scientists
20th-century African-American people
20th-century African-American women
American patent holders